Manningtree railway station is on the Great Eastern Main Line (GEML) in the East of England, serving the town of Manningtree, Essex. The three-letter station code is MNG.

The station is currently operated by Greater Anglia, who also operate all trains serving it, as part of the East Anglia franchise.

History
The station was opened by the Eastern Union Railway in 1846 but rebuilt by the Great Eastern Railway in 1899–1901; this building survives. It was designed by W. N. Ashbee.

Description

Immediately east of the station there is a triangle of junctions, known as the Manningtree South, North and East junctions and originally each double-track junction was controlled by an individual signal box. In 1926 the London and North Eastern Railway installed a new power box at Manningtree South which controlled all three junctions. All three sides of the triangle are electrified.

A second peculiar feature just east of the station is a combination of a road underpass and a level crossing. The underpass has limited height and the parallel level crossing is needed to permit higher vehicles to cross the railway.

Platform 1 is a bay platform accessible only from the Mayflower Line. It has an operational length for five-coach trains. Platform 2 (London-bound) and platform 3 (country-bound) each have an operational length for twelve-coach trains. There is a fourth platform on the outer side of the "down" (country-bound) platform which is electrified, but its use would be confined to emergency situations. It can only be used to access the main line to or from Ipswich .
The station has (on the London-bound platform) a staffed booking office and a self-service ticket machine. There is a side-gate west of the station building for use outside of office hours and a self-service ticket machine is also available here. There is a station buffet at the eastern end of the building.

The installation of lifts started in December 2015 and they are due to be in operation in Autumn 2016.

Accidents
On 20 August 1898, five people were slightly injured in a collision between a train and two carriages it was moving to attach to at Manningtree. The stationary carriages contained around 50 passengers and had just been detached from a main line train; they were due to be attached to the branch line train for Harwich Town but it reversed back to them at too great a speed and shunted into them with sufficient force to propel them backward by five or six yards. A Board of Trade investigation reported the driver misjudged the position of the carriages and the speed of his train, and the shunter failed to timely signal to the driver that he was too close to the coaches and moving too fast.

Services
The following services typically called at Manningtree in 2016:

References

External links

 Manningtree Rail Users Association

Railway stations in Essex
DfT Category C2 stations
Former Great Eastern Railway stations
Greater Anglia franchise railway stations
William Neville Ashbee railway stations
Railway stations in Great Britain opened in 1846
Tendring